Sir Roger Moore (1927–2017) was an English actor, most famous for his role as James Bond.

Roger Moore may also refer to:
Roger Moore (computer scientist) (1939–2019), designer and implementer of APL\360
Roger Moore (poker player) (1938–2011), member of the Poker Hall of Fame
Roger E. Moore (born 1955), writer of roleplaying games including Dungeons & Dragons
Roger R. Moore (born 1922), American politician
Rory O'Moore (c. 1600–1655), also known as Sir Roger Moore, a leader of the Irish Rebellion of 1641

See also
Moore (disambiguation)
Roger More (disambiguation)